Saint-Vincent-Cramesnil is a commune in the Seine-Maritime department in the Normandy region in northern France.

Geography
It's on the route of the Tour de Normandie cycle race, a qualifying race for the Tour de France.

Population

Places of interest
 The twelfth century church of St. Vincent.
 The château of Cramesnil, which belongs to the "du Douet de Graville" family.
 CâtilIon chateau.
 Two one-room school houses.

See also
Communes of the Seine-Maritime department

References

Communes of Seine-Maritime